A gros was a type of silver coinage of France from the time of Saint Louis. There were gros tournois and gros parisis. The gros was sub-divided in half gros and quarter gros. The original gros created by St Louis weighed about 4.52 g of nearly pure silver, and was valued at one sou, that is 12 deniers or 1/20 of a livre tournois. Unlike the gold écu that was minted in small numbers, mostly for prestige reasons, the gros was a very common coin, and very widely copied by non royal mints.

Notes

See also
 Groschen

Medieval currencies
Numismatics